Edwin Thiel (19 June 1913 – 14 July 1944) was a Luftwaffe ace and recipient of the Knight's Cross of the Iron Cross during World War II. The Knight's Cross of the Iron Cross was awarded to recognise extreme battlefield bravery or successful military leadership. Edwin Thiel was killed on 14 July 1944 after bailing out of his plane after it was hit by Soviet flak. During his career he was credited with 76 victories in 300 missions.

Career
Thiel was born on 19 June 1913 in Oberbexbach in the Saarland, which at the time was politically part of the Kingdom of Bavaria of the German Empire. Prior to World War II, he qualified as a civil pilot and flew with Deutsche Luft Hansa and served a flight instructor. In late 1941, Thiel was posted to I. Gruppe (1st group) of Jagdgeschwader 51 "Mölders" (JG 51—51st Fighter Wing).

On 29 May 1942, Thiel was appointed Staffelkapitän (squadron leader) of 2. Staffel of JG 51. He succeeded Leutnant Erwin Fleig who had been shot down behind enemy lines and became a prisoner of war. In July 1943, Thiel was transferred to Ergänzungs-Jagdgruppe Ost, specialized training unit for new fighter pilots destined for the Eastern Front, as an instructor. There, he commanded the 1. Staffel. Thiel was replaced by Oberleutnant Horst Haase as commander of 2. Staffel of JG 51.

In May 1944, Thiel transferred back to JG 51. There, he was given command of the Stabsstaffel which had temporarily been led by Leutnant Herbert Friebel after Oberleutnant Diethelm von Eichel-Streiber was transferred in April 1944. Command of the Stabsstaffel was then given to Oberleutnant Heinz Busse.

Summary of career

Aerial victory claims
According to Spick, Thiel was credited with 76 aerial victories claimed in an unknown number of combat missions, all of which claimed on the Eastern Front. Mathews and Foreman, authors of Luftwaffe Aces — Biographies and Victory Claims, researched the German Federal Archives and found records for 71 aerial victory claims, all of which claimed on the Eastern Front in over 300 combat missions.

Victory claims were logged to a map-reference (PQ = Planquadrat), for example "PQ 37651". These sectors were then subdivided into 36 smaller units to give a location area 3 × 4 km in size.

Awards
 Flugzeugführerabzeichen
 Front Flying Clasp of the Luftwaffe
 Iron Cross (1939) 2nd and 1st Class
 Honour Goblet of the Luftwaffe (Ehrenpokal der Luftwaffe) on 15 June 1942 as Leutnant and pilot
 German Cross in Gold on 9 September 1942 as Leutnant in the I./Jagdgeschwader 51
 Knight's Cross of the Iron Cross on 16 April 1943 as Oberleutnant and Staffelführer of the 2./Jagdgeschwader 51 "Mölders"

Notes

References

Citations

Bibliography

External links
Luftwaffe 1939–1945 History
TracesOfWar.com
Aces of the Luftwaffe

1913 births
1944 deaths
People from Saarpfalz-Kreis
Luftwaffe pilots
German World War II flying aces
Recipients of the Gold German Cross
Recipients of the Knight's Cross of the Iron Cross
People from the Rhine Province
Luftwaffe personnel killed in World War II
Aviators killed by being shot down
Military personnel from Saarland